Sean Burrage currently serves as the Vice President for Executive Affairs at the University of Oklahoma in Norman, Oklahoma.

Burrage was named as President of Southeastern Oklahoma State University in Durant, Oklahoma on May 15, 2014, by the Regional University System of Oklahoma Board of Regents. He began his duties on July 1, 2014.  An Antlers native, Burrage completed his second term as an Oklahoma State Senator (District 2) in May 2014. He did not seek a third term in office.

On July 7, 2014,  an overflow crowd officially welcomed Burrage to Durant with a reception at the Choctaw Event Center.
Among those in attendance were numerous elected officials, higher education regents and presidents, business leaders, and university and community representatives. Burrage is a member of the Choctaw Nation of Oklahoma.

President Burrage was appointed to the Governor's Education Advisory Committee in 2015, and the State Regents’ Task Force on the Future of Higher Education in 2017. He also serves on the Oklahoma Ordinance Works Authority and the Oklahoma Board of Juvenile Affairs.

Burrage served as Vice Chairman of the Legislative Affairs Committee of the Council of Presidents (Oklahoma). He served as Chairman of Imagine Durant, member of the Durant Industrial Authority Board, and member of the Durant Economic Development Council.

Burrage received his accounting and law degrees from the University of Oklahoma.

Early life and career
Raised in Antlers, Oklahoma, Burrage received his undergraduate and law degrees from the University of Oklahoma. He served the State of Oklahoma as former U.S. Senator David L. Boren's Legislative Director in Washington, D.C., and continued his public service as Special Assistant and Director of State and Federal Relations to Boren after he became president of the University of Oklahoma.

Burrage is a past board member of the University Hospitals Authority at the University of Oklahoma Medical Center.

Burrage played an active role in the communities of Rogers and Mayes Counties by serving on the board of directors for Tri-County CASA and as President of Share the Spirit, a local charity that has helped many families. He was named Tri-County CASA Attorney of the Year in 2001 in recognition for his pro-bono representation of minor children in the juvenile court system.

Personal life
Sean is married to Julie Wohlgemuth Burrage and has two sons from a previous marriage, Truman and Carter. Sean is the son of former United States District Judge Michael Burrage and Aletha Burrage, a retired elementary school principal. He is also the nephew of former State Auditor and Inspector Steve Burrage. S

Political career

Burrage represented Oklahoma Senate District 2 beginning in  2006. The district is located in Rogers and Mayes County.

Burrage served as the Senate Minority Floor Leader.

Law practice

Burrage was a partner in the Claremore, Oklahoma law firm of Taylor, Burrage, Foster, Mallett, Downs, Ramsey & Russell.  He is member of the Oklahoma Bar Association and is admitted to practice before the United States Supreme Court, United States Court of Appeals for the  Tenth Circuit, United States District Courts for the Northern, Eastern, and Western Districts of Oklahoma.  He is the past President of the Rogers County Bar Association, is a member of the American Bar Association, and currently serves as an Associate Bar Examiner.  He has been recognized by his peers as a Super Lawyer and is listed in the publication Best Lawyers in America.

Burrage was co-lead counsel in the I-40 bridge cases in Oklahoma and has represented numerous corporate clients in defense matters in state and federal courts throughout Oklahoma. Burrage's published opinions include the following:

Magnolia Marine Transport Co. v. OK, 366 F.3d 1153 (10th Cir. Okla., 2004).

In re B.C., 15 P.3d 8 (Okla. Civ. App. 2000).

Election results
November 7, 2006 General Election

References

External links
 Senator Sean Burrage - District 2 official State Senate website
 Sean Burrage for State Senate official campaign website
 Project Vote Smart - Senator Sean Burrage (OK) profile
 Follow the Money - Michael Sean Burrage
 2008 2006 campaign contributions

1968 births
21st-century American politicians
21st-century Native American politicians
Living people
Choctaw Nation of Oklahoma state legislators in Oklahoma
Democratic Party Oklahoma state senators
People from Claremore, Oklahoma
People from Durant, Oklahoma
Presidents of Southeastern Oklahoma State University
University of Oklahoma alumni